A Fool's Paradise is the second studio album by the American band Lazarus. It was released in January 1973 by Bearsville Records, distributed by Warner Bros. Records. All of the songs were written by Bill Hughes with the exception of "Oklahoma Boy" written by Carl Keesee. The album was produced by Peter Yarrow and Phil Ramone. It received significant national airplay on leading progressive FM stations.

"Ladyfriends I (Sing a Song to Your Lady)" was issued as the first single. It is included, with "Baby, Baby", in the Bearsville Bear Pack No 1 compilation of tracks considered collectors' items released as a Vinyl LP by WEA, originating in the UK in 1977. The album featured Bobby Charles, Hungry Chuck, Paul Butterfield, Jesse Winchester and Lazarus.

The album was released by Pony Canyon in Japan on September 6, 1995. It was reissued by Rhino Records on CD and digitally.

Critical reception 
Billboard's Top Picks reviewer declared “Beautifully done in every aspect, from fine songs, beautiful harmony vocals to superb instrumental arrangements”…remarking that Hughes and Keesee “have excellent voices and Hughes, who penned all the material, is a top writer”.  The reviewer praised the group's ability “to combine rock and orchestral instruments without gimmicks and without sounding pretentious,” “condense its material so it doesn't drag” and its authenticity, opining “A bit of many styles but a copy of none.”

Track listing

Credits and personnel
As listed in the liner notes.

Lazarus
 Bill Hughes – vocal, guitar, piano, harp
 Carl Keesee – vocal, bass
 Gary Dye – vocal, piano, organ

Production
 Phil Ramone – producer
 Peter Yarrow – producer
 Nick Jameson – drums, percussion
 Chris Dedrick – orchestration
 Peter Yarrow – musical director
 Phil Ramone – recording engineer
 Nick Jameson – additional production, remix
 Jim Maxwell and Susan Lee – special thanks
 Tom Zetterstrom - photography
 Tim Luft - design and illustration
 William C. Klein, Jr. – color tinting

References

1973 albums
Albums produced by Phil Ramone
Bearsville Records albums
Contemporary Christian music albums by American artists
Warner Music Group albums
Pony Canyon albums